James G. Lilly (born September 30, 1981) is a Republican member of the Michigan House of Representatives.

Biography 
Lilly is currently attending Grand Valley State University pursuing a master's degree in Business Administration. Lilly was named Legislator of the Year by Michigan Municipal League in 2019.

References

External links 
 Jim Lilly at gophouse.org

Living people
1981 births
John Carroll University alumni
Republican Party members of the Michigan House of Representatives
21st-century American politicians
People from Ypsilanti, Michigan